Egano Righi-Lambertini (22 February 1906 – 4 October 2000) was an Italian prelate of the Catholic Church.

He spent decades in the diplomatic service of the Holy See and from 1957 to 1974 held a series of appointments as Papal Delegate to Korea and then Papal Nuncio to Lebanon, Chile, Italy, and France. He was made a cardinal in 1979.

Biography 
Egano Righi-Lambertini was born on 22 February 1906 in Casalecchio di Reno, Italy. He attended the Pontifical Regional Seminary of Bologna and was ordained a priest of the Archdiocese of Bologna on 25 May 1929.

To prepare for a diplomatic career he entered the Pontifical Ecclesiastical Academy in 1935.

Beginning in 1939, he held positions of increasing responsibility in the diplomatic service of the Holy See, serving in Italy, France, Costa Rica and Venezuela and in the apostolic delegation to Great Britain. On 10 December 1957, he was named Apostolic Delegate to Korea.

On 9 July 1960, he was appointed titular archbishop of Doclea and Apostolic Nuncio to Lebanon.

On 28 October 1960, he received his episcopal consecration from Pope John XXIII.

On 3 December 1963, he was appointed Apostolic Nuncio to Chile.

On 8 July 1967, he was appointed Apostolic Nuncio to Italy.

On 23 April 1969, he was appointed Apostolic Nuncio to France.

He was made a cardinal by Pope John Paul II in the consistory held on 30 June 1979 and became Cardinal Deacon of San Giovanni Bosco in Via Tuscolana. On 24 July 1979, he was named a member of the Council for the Public Affairs of the Church, the Congregation for Bishops, and the Secretariat for Non-Christians.

On 26 November 1990, he exercised his option to take the title Cardinal Priest and was assigned the titular church of Santa Maria in Via.

He died in Rome on 4 October 2000 and his remains were interred in the cemetery of the town where he was born.

References

1906 births
2000 deaths
Diplomats from Bologna
Pontifical Ecclesiastical Academy alumni
Apostolic Nuncios to France
Apostolic Nuncios to South Korea
Apostolic Nuncios to Lebanon
Apostolic Nuncios to Chile
Apostolic Nuncios to Italy
20th-century Italian Roman Catholic archbishops
20th-century Italian cardinals
20th-century Italian Roman Catholic priests
Cardinals created by Pope John Paul II
Clergy from Bologna